Vladimir Nikolayevich Beklemishev (Hrodna4 September 1962, Moscow) was a Russian zoologist and entomologist.

Beklemishev began his career at Saint Petersburg University. In 1918 he moved to Perm where he held the post of a docent at the recently opened Perm University, becoming  professor of the same university in 1920. After 1932 he was the head of the Division of  Entomology of the Institute of Malaria and Medical Parasitology in Moscow (now the Institute of Medical Parasitology and Tropical Medicine (IM). After 1934 he became the professor of the Department of Zoology and Comparative Anatomy of Moscow State University. During his career he was particularly involved with medical entomology.
Beklemishev was an active member of the Academy of Medical Sciences (AMN) (1945) and Polish AN (1949), an Honoured Scientist of the RSFSR (1947) and twice received the Stalin Prize award (1944, 1952).

Selected works
The basis of the comparative anatomy of the invertebrates (1944,1950,1964). 
Medical entomology (1949).
The basis of comparative parasitology. Medical Science. (1976)(first published?). 
Methodology of systematics. KMK Scientific Press Ltd. (1994).(first published?)

Sources
Literature Biologists. Biographical reference book. Kiev: Naukova Dumka. 1984. *Vladimir Nikolayevich Beklemiwev. Medical parasitology and parasitic diseases.

1890 births
1962 deaths
People from Grodno
Academic staff of Perm State University
Russian entomologists
Academicians of the USSR Academy of Medical Sciences
Stalin Prize winners
Soviet entomologists